Tonight at Eleven (Italian: Stasera alle undici) is a 1938 Italian "white-telephones" mystery film directed by Oreste Biancoli and starring John Lodge, Francesca Braggiotti and Ivana Claar.

It was shot at the Cinecittà Studios in Rome. The film's sets were designed by the art director Guido Fiorini.

Cast
John Lodge as Jack Morris 
Francesca Braggiotti as Lady Elena Norton 
Ivana Claar as Ivana 
Bianca Stagno Bellincioni as La marchesa di Fondi 
Enrico Glori as Gabry, il gangster 
Piero Pastore as Willy 
Memo Benassi as L'ambasciatore Leopoldo Norton 
Sergio Tofano as Il colonnello Muffon 
Clara Padoa as Dorothy 
Cesare Zoppetti as Severino 
Vittorio Vaser as Walter 
Renato Chiantoni as Il delatore del "Luna Bar" 
Arturo Bragaglia as Il pianista del "Luna Bar" 
Emilio Petacci as Il maggiordomo del ministero del Commercio 
Cesare Polacco as Il benzinaio 
Ugo Sasso as Leone 
Paolo Varna as Max 
Liolà Bonfili
Nino Marchetti as Il direttore del cinema 
Edda Soligo as La ragazza del tiro a segno 
Eduardo Passarelli

References

Bibliography
Roberto Chiti & Roberto Poppi. I film: Tutti i film italiani dal 1930 al 1944. Gremese Editore, 2005.

External links

1938 films
1930s Italian-language films
Films directed by Oreste Biancoli
1938 mystery films
Italian mystery films
Films shot at Cinecittà Studios
Italian black-and-white films
1930s Italian films